Bree is a feminine given name and a surname. Van Bree is a surname. Notable people and fictional characters with either of the names include:

Surname
 Andrew Bree (born 1981), Irish swimmer
 Declan Bree (born 1951), Irish politician
 Herbert Bree (1828–1899), Anglican bishop
 James Bree (actor) (1923–2008), British actor
 James Bree (footballer) (born 1997), English footballer
 Jonathan Bree, singer-songwriter and producer in New Zealand
 Johannes Bernardus van Bree (1801–1857), Dutch composer, musician
 Mattheus Ignatius van Bree (1773–1839), Belgian painter, sculptor and architect
 Philippe-Jacques van Bree (1786–1871), Belgian architectural scholar and brother of Mattheus
 Robert Bree (1759–1839), English physician
 William Bree (1822–1917), Archdeacon of Coventry

Given name
 Bree Amer (born 1982), Australian television personality
 Bree Munro (born 1981), Australian aerial freestyle skier
 Bree Sharp (born 1975), American singer-songwriter
 Bree Turner (born 1977), American actress
 Bree Walker (born 1953), American television news anchor
 Bree White (born 1981), Australian rules footballer
 Bree Williamson (born 1979), Canadian actress

Nickname
 Bree Cuppoletti (1910–1960), American National Football League player
 Briony Cole (born 1983), Australian retired diver

Fictional characters
 Bree (Narnia), a talking horse from the Narnia novel The Horse and His Boy by C. S. Lewis
 Bree Avery, main character of the web video series lonelygirl15
 Bree Buchanan, on the American soap opera One Life to Live
 Bree Larson Buchanan, one of the main characters in the TV series The Five Mrs. Buchanans
 Bree Daniels, in the 1971 movie Klute, played by Jane Fonda
 Bree Davenport, one of the main characters in the TV series Lab Rats
 Bree Hamilton, on the New Zealand soap opera Shortland Street
 Bree Tanner, a vampire in the Twilight series of novels and films
 Bree Timmins, on the Australian soap opera Neighbours
 Bree Van de Kamp, on the American television series Desperate Housewives
 Bree, from the film Cedar Rapids

See also 
 Brie (name)
 Shane O'Bree (born 1979), former Australian rules football player

Feminine given names
Lists of people by nickname